Triathlon at the 2019 Pacific Games was held on 19–20 July 2019 at the Sogi Recreational Park in Apia, Samoa.

Medal summary

Medal table

Aquathon

Triathlon

See also
 Triathlon at the Pacific Games

References

2019 Pacific Games
Pacific Games
2019